The 2019 Kawasaki Frontale season was their 15th consecutive season in J1 League. They were the defending champions after finishing top of 2018 J1 League. They also competed in the Emperor's Cup, J.League Cup, Japanese Super Cup and AFC Champions League.

Squad 
As of 14 January 2019.

Competitions

Super Cup

J1 League

Table

Results

J. League Cup

Results

Emperor's Cup

AFC Champions League

Group standings

Results

Post season

References 

Kawasaki Frontale
Kawasaki Frontale seasons